This is a partial list of original Air Service, United States Army "Aero Squadrons" before and during World War I.  Units formed after 1 January 1919, are not listed.

Aero Squadrons were the designation of the first United States Army aviation units until the end of World War I.   These units consisted of combat flying, training, ground support, construction and other components of the Air Service.   After World War I ended, the majority of these squadrons were demobilized.  Some however were retained during the interwar period of the 1920s and 1930s, and served in all theaters of operation during World War II.   Today, the oldest squadrons in the United States Air Force and Air National Guard can trace their lineage back to the original Aero Squadrons of World War I.

Overview
In January 1918 a new numbering scheme for aero squadrons was set up. Numbers 1–399 would be for Aero Service Squadrons (AS). 400–599 Aero Construction Squadrons (ACS), 600–799 Aero Supply Squadrons and 800–1099 Aero Repair Squadrons.   Non-notable support squadrons are not listed.

The numerical designation of school squadrons at the various flying fields in the United States was discontinued in July 1918, and replaced by letter designation. For example, the 2d Aero Squadron became Squadron A, Kelly Field. In November 1918, the personnel of the lettered squadrons of each flying field was merged into a single Flying School Detachment at such station.

In addition to the Aero Squadrons, whose mission supported airplanes in one way or another, Air Service Spruce Squadrons have been noted and listed.  A part of the Signal Corps, they were located in Oregon and Washington states.   When the U.S. entered World War I, it was quickly discovered that the nation had no capacity to build warplanes in quantity.  Spruce timber, vital to wing construction was in critically short supply.  In 1918, the United States Army stepped in and took over the production of airplane spruce in the pacific northwest, with the Spruce Production Division organizing loggers and constructing a plant to process the wood, construct roads and railroads into the forests to access and cut the timber.

Men in the Spruce Squadrons were part of the Signal Corps along with the Aero Squadrons, as the Signal Corps oversaw all Army aviation.  About 50,000 soldiers were assigned to Spruce Squadrons, overseeing about 100,000 lumber workers, were assigned to small camps in the Pacific Northwest.   Many of these men were itching to go "over there" and take part in combat, however, their labor and skills to produce spruce lumber were needed far more, in the forests of the Pacific Northwest to produce the materiel needed to build aircraft.  The camps where the soldiers were located are listed on the individual squadron entry.

Squadrons

1st to 24th Aero Squadrons
At the time of the United States entry into World War I in April 1917, three Aero Squadrons had been formed.  The 1st and 3d were in the United States, and the 2d was in the Philippines.   The 6th, being destined for Hawaii and the 7th, destined for the Panama Canal Zone were organizing.  The 4th and 5th, to be based in the continental United States had yet to receive personnel.

25th to 49th Aero Squadrons

50th to 74th Aero Squadrons

75th to 99th Aero Squadrons

100th to 149th Aero Squadrons

150th to 199th Aero Squadrons

200th to 249th Aero Squadrons

250th to 299th Aero Squadrons

300th to 324th Aero Squadrons

325th to 349th Aero Squadrons

350th to 399th Aero Squadrons

400th to 449th Aero Squadrons

450th to 499th Aero Squadrons

500th to 799th Aero Squadrons

800th Aero Squadron and above

Provisional squadrons, Spruce Production Division

See also

 Aeronautical Division, U.S. Signal Corps 1 August 1907 – 18 July 1914
 Aviation Section, U.S. Signal Corps 18 July 1914 – 20 May 1918
 Division of Military Aeronautics 20 May 1918 – 24 May 1918
 United States Army Air Service 24 May 1918 – 2 July 1926
 United States Army Air Corps 2 July 1926 – 20 June 1941
 United States Army Air Forces 20 June 1941 – 18 September 1947
 United States Air Force 18 September 1947–present
 List of World War I flying aces from the United States
 List of Training Section Air Service airfields
 List of Air Service American Expeditionary Force aerodromes in France
 Organization of the Air Service of the American Expeditionary Force
 Spruce Production Division

References

Citations

Bibliography

External links
 Kroll, Harry David. – Kelly Field in the Great World War. – Press of San Antonio. – 1919. – Page 82.
 https://web.archive.org/web/20100324025204/http://www.afhra.af.mil/index.asp
 http://www.usaww1.com/index.php4
 Equipment for aero units of the Aviation Section (Signal Corps), tentative, 1916
 Gorrell's History – AEF Air Service
 squadron assignments
 Squadron Insignias
 http://www.worldwar1.com/dbc/airserv1.htm
 http://www.tioh.hqda.pentagon.mil/Heraldry/AirForce/AirForceHeraldry.aspx
 National Personnel Records Center

Squadrons of the United States Army Air Service
Lists of flying squadrons
Lists of military units and formations of World War I
Lists of United States Army units and formations

cs:Letecká sekce Spojovacího sboru Spojených států